The following highways are numbered 404:

Australia 
 - Victoria

Canada
 Manitoba Provincial Road 404
 Newfoundland and Labrador Route 404
 Ontario Highway 404

Costa Rica
 National Route 404

Israel
 Route 404 (Israel)

Japan
 Japan National Route 404

United Kingdom
  A404 road  London - Maidenhead
  A404(M)  Berkshire

United States
  Delaware Route 404
 Delaware Route 404 Alternate (former)
 Delaware Route 404 Business
 Delaware Route 404 Truck
  Florida State Road 404
  Georgia State Route 404 (unsigned designation for Interstate 16)
  Georgia State Route 404 Spur
  Iowa Highway 404 (unsigned designation for U.S. Route 75 Business)
  Maryland Route 404
 Maryland Route 404 Alternate
  Maryland Route 404 Business
  New Mexico State Road 404
 New York:
  New York State Route 404
 New York State Route 404 (former)
 County Route 404 (Albany County, New York)
  County Route 404 (Erie County, New York)
  Puerto Rico Highway 404
 Texas:
  Texas State Highway Loop 404
  Farm to Market Road 404 (former)
  Virginia State Route 404